This is a list of exceptional red dwarfs.

List of titleholding red dwarf stars
This is a list of red dwarfs that currently hold records.

List of red dwarf firsts

List of red dwarf extremes

List of named red dwarfs
This is a list of red dwarfs with names that are not systematically designated.

List of nearest red dwarfs

List of least voluminous red dwarfs

Timeline of smallest red dwarf recordholders
This is a list of titleholders of being the red dwarf with the smallest volume, and its succession over time.

See also
 List of least massive stars
 List of brown dwarfs
 Lists of stars

References

Red dwarfs